Zerfaliu (Zrofollìu in Sardinian language) is a comune (municipality) in the Province of Oristano in the Italian region Sardinia, located about  northwest of Cagliari and about  northeast of Oristano.

Zerfaliu borders the following municipalities: Ollastra, Paulilatino, Simaxis, Solarussa, Villanova Truschedu.

References

External links

Zerfaliu - culture, traditions, tastes

Cities and towns in Sardinia